In October 1904 the Minneapolis, St. Paul and Sault Ste. Marie Railway (Soo Line) and Canadian Pacific Railway began overnight passenger service between the Twin Cities and Winnipeg, Manitoba. The train consisted of a mail and baggage cars, two coaches, a sleeper and dining car.  The train went by several names over its 62 years: Manitoba Express (1904–1909), Winnipeg Express (1919–1928) and the Winnipeger (1928–1967). It commonly was called the Winnipeg Flyer.

Diesel locomotives replaced steam between Saint Paul and Thief River Falls, Minnesota from May 1951, and diesels took over the entire route in April of the following year.  Originally numbered 109 and 110, the Winnipeger was renumbered 9 and 10 in the general renumbering of Soo Line passenger trains at the end of August 1952, but remained Trains 109 and 110 on Canadian Pacific. From January 1954, the Winnipeger was combined with Trains 13 and 14, the Soo-Dominion/Mountaineer, from Saint Paul to Glenwood, Minnesota, where the trains split, with the Soo-Dominion/Mountaineer continuing on to Canada via Portal, North Dakota.  The Soo-Dominion terminated at Portal from late 1960 and came off entirely in December 1963, and through service to western Canada ran via Winnipeg on the Winnepeger.

The last season of two-section operation was 1964, when between June 26–27 and September 8–9, the Winnipeger ran as one section to Glenwood, where a meal stop was taken, dining car service having been dispensed with by 1961.  The train was switched into two sections for the remainder of run to Winnipeg. Soo first 9 / Canadian Pacific 111 and CP 112 / Soo second 10 ran to/from Winnipeg (non-stop while in Canada), while Soo second 9 / CP 107 and CP 108 / Soo first 10 carried the Vancouver cars and did the local work from Emerson to Winnipeg. Saint Paul to Vancouver though service was discontinued the following year.

In May 1965, the train lost the Canada Post mail contract for the Emerson–Winnipeg run, and the following month the United States Post Office pulled the US mail off the train as well. The express contract was lost in October 1966, and the train struggled on until the night of March 23/24, 1967, when the Winnipeger made its last run.

See also
 Winnipeg Limited

References

Soo Line Railroad
Named passenger trains of Canada
Named passenger trains of the United States
International named passenger trains
Night trains of Canada
Night trains of the United States
Passenger rail transportation in Minnesota
Passenger rail transport in Manitoba
Railway services introduced in 1928
Canadian Pacific Railway passenger trains
Railway services discontinued in 1967